Donaldson Toussaint L'Ouverture Byrd II (December 9, 1932 – February 4, 2013) was an American jazz and rhythm & blues trumpeter and vocalist. A sideman for many other jazz musicians of his generation, Byrd was one of the few hard bop musicians who successfully explored funk and soul while remaining a jazz artist. As a bandleader, Byrd was an influence on the early career of Herbie Hancock.

Biography

Early life and career
Byrd was born in 1932 in Detroit, Michigan. His family came from the African-American middle-class. His father, Elijah Thomas Byrd, was a Methodist minister who greatly valued education and oversaw his son's schooling. His mother, Cornelia Taylor, introduced Byrd to jazz music and it was her brother who gave Byrd his first trumpet. He attended Cass Technical High School. He performed with Lionel Hampton before finishing high school. During this period, his first professional recording session was in 1949 at Fortune Records in Detroit with the Robert Barnes Sextette for the single "Black Eyed Peas" / "Bobbin’ At Barbee’s."  After playing in a military band during a term in the United States Air Force, Byrd obtained a bachelor's degree in music from Wayne State University and a master's degree from Manhattan School of Music. While still at the Manhattan School, he joined Art Blakey's Jazz Messengers as Clifford Brown’s successor. In 1955, he recorded with Gigi Gryce, Jackie McLean and Mal Waldron. After leaving the Jazz Messengers in 1956, he performed with many leading jazz musicians of the day, including John Coltrane, Sonny Rollins, Thelonious Monk, and later Herbie Hancock.

Byrd's first regular group was a quintet that he co-led from 1958 to 1961 with baritone saxophonist Pepper Adams. The ensemble’s hard-driving performances are captured live on At the Half Note Cafe. Byrd's 1961 LP Royal Flush was Hancock’s Blue Note debut. Hancock has credited Byrd as a key influence in his early career, recounting that Byrd took the young pianist "under his wing" when he was a struggling musician newly arrived in New York, even letting him sleep on a hide-a-bed in his Bronx apartment for several years.

He was the first person to let me be a permanent member of an internationally known band. He has always nurtured and encouraged young musicians. He's a born educator, it seems to be in his blood, and he really tried to encourage the development of creativity.

Hancock also recalled that Byrd helped him in many other ways: he encouraged Hancock to make his debut album for Blue Note, connected him with Mongo Santamaria, who turned Hancock's tune "Watermelon Man" into a chart-topping hit, and that Byrd also later urged him to accept Miles Davis' offer to join his quintet.

Hancock also credits Byrd with giving him one of the most important pieces of advice of his career – not to give away his publishing rights. When Blue Note offered Hancock the chance to record his first solo LP, label executives tried to convince him to relinquish his publishing in exchange for being able to record the album, but he stuck to Byrd's advice and refused, so the meeting came to an impasse. At this point, he stood up to leave and when it became clear that he was about to walk out, the executives relented and allowed him to retain his publishing. Thanks to Santamaria's subsequent hit cover version of "Watermelon Man", Hancock was soon receiving substantial royalties, and he used his first royalty check of $6,000 to buy his first car, a 1963 Shelby Cobra (also recommended by Byrd) which Hancock still owns, and which is now the oldest production Cobra still in its original owner's hands.

In June 1964, Byrd played with Eric Dolphy in Paris only two weeks before Dolphy died from insulin shock.

Electric Byrd
By 1969's Fancy Free, Byrd was moving away from the hard bop jazz idiom and began to record jazz fusion and rhythm and blues. He teamed up with the Mizell Brothers (producer-writers Larry and Fonce) for Black Byrd (1973) which was, for many years, Blue Note's best-selling album. The title track climbed to No. 19 on Billboard′s R&B chart and reached the Hot 100 pop chart, peaking at No. 88. The Mizell brothers' follow-up albums for Byrd, Street Lady, Places and Spaces and Stepping into Tomorrow, were also big sellers, and have subsequently provided a rich source of samples for acid jazz artists such as Us3. Most of the material for the albums was written by Larry Mizell.

In 1973, he helped to establish and co-produce the Blackbyrds, a fusion group consisting of then-student musicians from Howard University, where Byrd taught in the music department and earned his J.D. in 1976. They scored several major hits including "Happy Music" (No. 3 R&B, No. 19 pop), "Walking in Rhythm" (No. 4 R&B, No. 6 pop) and "Rock Creek Park".

During his tenure at North Carolina Central University during the 1980s, he formed a group which included students from the college called the "125th St NYC Band". They recorded three albums; Love Byrd and Words, Sounds, Colors and Shapes which featured Isaac Hayes. "Love Has Come Around" on Love Byrd became a disco hit, reaching number No. 4 on Billboard's U.S. Dance Club Songs and in the UK and reached No. 41 on the charts.

Beginning in the 1960s, Byrd (who eventually gained his PhD in music education from Teachers College, Columbia University in 1982) taught at a variety of postsecondary institutions, including Rutgers University, the Hampton Institute, New York University, Howard University, Queens College, Oberlin College, Cornell University, North Carolina Central University and Delaware State University. Byrd returned to somewhat straight-ahead jazz later in his career, recording three albums for Orrin Keepnews' Landmark Records.

Byrd was a resident of Teaneck, New Jersey. He died on February 4, 2013, in Dover, Delaware, at age 80.

Discography

As leader/co-leader 
 1955: Byrd Jazz (Transition, 1956) – live
 1955: Byrd's Eye View (Transition, 1956)
 1955: Byrd's Word (Savoy, 1956)
 1956: 2 Trumpets with Art Farmer (Prestige, 1957)
 1956: The Young Bloods with Phil Woods (Prestige, 1957)
 1956: Modern Jazz Perspective with Gigi Gryce (Columbia, 1957)
 1956: Byrd Blows on Beacon Hill (Transition, 1957)
 1957: Jazz Lab with Gigi Gryce (Columbia, 1957)
 1957: New Formulas from the Jazz Lab with Gigi Gryce (Vik, 1982)
 1957: At Newport with Gigi Gryce and Cecil Taylor([[Verve Records|Verve, 1958) – live
 1957: Modern Jazz Perspective with Gigi Gryce (Columbia, 1957)
 1957: Jazz Eyes (Regent, 1957)
 1957: Jazz Lab with Gigi Gryce (Jubilee, 1958)
 1959: Off to the Races (Blue Note, 1959)
 1959: Byrd in Hand (Blue Note, 1959)
 1959: Fuego (Blue Note, 1960)
 1960: At the Half Note Cafe (Blue Note, 1960)
 1960: Byrd in Flight (Blue Note, 1960)
 1960: Motor City Scene with Pepper Adams (Bethlehem, 1960)
 1961: The Cat Walk (Blue Note, 1962)
 1961: Royal Flush (Blue Note, 1962)
 1961: Free Form (Blue Note, 1966)
 1961: Chant (Blue Note, 1979)
 1963: A New Perspective (Blue Note, 1964)
 1964: I'm Tryin' to Get Home (Blue Note, 1965)
 1964: Up with Donald Byrd (Verve, 1965)
 1966: Mustang (Blue Note, 1967)
 1967: Blackjack (Blue Note, 1968)
 1967: Slow Drag (Blue Note, 1968)
 1967: The Creeper (Blue Note, 1981)
 1969: Fancy Free (Blue Note, 1970)
 1970: Electric Byrd (Blue Note, 1970)
 1971: Kofi (Blue Note, 1995)
 1971: Ethiopian Knights (Blue Note, 1972)
 1972: Black Byrd (Blue Note, 1973)
 1973 Street Lady (Blue Note, 1973)
 1974: Stepping into Tomorrow (Blue Note, 1975)
 1976: Places and Spaces (Blue Note, 1976)
 1976: Caricatures (Blue Note, 1976)
 1978: Thank You...For F.U.M.L. (Funking Up My Life) (Elektra, 1978)
 1979: Donald Byrd and 125th Street, N.Y.C. (Elektra, 1979)
 1981: Love Byrd (Elektra, 1981)
 1982: Words, Sounds, Colors and Shapes (Elektra, 1982)
 1987: Harlem Blues (Landmark, 1988)
 1989: Getting Down to Business (Landmark, 1990)
 1991: A City Called Heaven (Landmark, 1991)

As sideman 

With Art Blakey
 1956: The Jazz Messengers (Columbia, 1956)
 1956: Originally (Columbia, 1982)
 1957: Art Blakey Big Band (Bethlehem, 1959)
 1958: Holiday for Skins (Blue Note, 1959)

With Kenny Burrell
 1956: All Night Long (Prestige, 1957)
 1957: All Day Long (Prestige, 1957)
 1957: 2 Guitars (Prestige, 1957)

With Paul Chambers
 1956: Whims of Chambers (Blue Note, 1957)
 1957: Paul Chambers Quintet (Blue Note, 1958)

With Sonny Clark
 1957: Sonny's Crib (Blue Note, 1958)
 1957-59: My Conception (Blue Note, 1979)

With Kenny Clarke
 Bohemia After Dark (Savoy, 1955)
 Klook's Clique (Savoy, 1956)

With John Coltrane
 1957-58: Lush Life (Prestige, 1958)
 1957-58: The Believer (Prestige, 1964)
 1957-58: The Last Trane (Prestige, 1966)
 1958: Black Pearls (Prestige, 1964)

With Eric Dolphy
 1960-64: Naima (Jazzway, 1987)
 1964: Unrealized Tapes (Last Recordings) (West Wind, 1988)

With Lou Donaldson
 1957: Wailing With Lou (Blue Note, 1957)
 1957: Lou Takes Off (Blue Note, 1958)

With Red Garland
 1957: All Mornin' Long (Prestige, 1958)
 1957: Soul Junction (Prestige, 1960)
 1957: High Pressure (Prestige, 1961)

With Dexter Gordon
 1964 One Flight Up (Blue Note, 1965)
 1965: Ladybird (SteepleChase, 2005)

With Guru 
 1992-93: Jazzmatazz, Vol. 1 (Chrysalis, 1993)
 1994-95: Guru's Jazzmatazz, Vol. 2: The New Reality (Chrysalis, 1995)

With Hank Jones
 1955: Quartet-Quintet (Savoy, 1955)
 1955: Bluebird (Savoy, 1956)

With Hank Mobley
 1956: The Jazz Message of Hank Mobley (Prestige, 1956)
 1956: Mobley's Message (Prestige, 1957)
 1956: Jazz Message No. 2 (Savoy, 1957)
 1956: Hank Mobley Sextet (Blue Note, 1957)
 1957: Hank (Blue Note, 1957)
 1963: No Room for Squares (Blue Note, 1964)
 1963-65: The Turnaround! (Blue Note, 1965)
 1963-66: Straight No Filter (Blue Note, 1986)
 1967: Far Away Lands (Blue Note, 1984)

With Jackie McLean
 1955: Presenting... Jackie McLean (Ad Lib, 1956)
 1956: Lights Out! (Prestige, 1956)
 1956: 4, 5 and 6 (Prestige, 1956)
 1959: New Soil (Blue Note, 1959)
 1959: Jackie's Bag (Blue Note, 1961)
 1963: Vertigo (Blue Note, 1980)

With Duke Pearson
 1962: Hush! (Jazztime, 1962)
 1964: Wahoo! (Blue Note, 1965)

With Oscar Pettiford
 1955: Another One (Bethlehem, 1955)
 1957: Winner's Circle (Bethlehem, 1958)

With Sonny Rollins 
 Sonny Rollins, Volume 1 (Blue Note, 1957) – recorded in 1956
 Don't Stop the Carnival (Milestone, 1978) – live

With Horace Silver
 1956: Silver's Blue (Epic, 1957)
 1956: 6 Pieces of Silver (Blue Note, 1957)

With Jimmy Smith
 A Date with Jimmy Smith Volume One (Blue Note, 1957)
 A Date with Jimmy Smith Volume Two (Blue Note, 1957)

With George Wallington
 1955: George Wallington Quintet at The Bohemia (Progressive, 1956) – live
 1956: Jazz for the Carriage Trade (Prestige, 1956)
 1957: The New York Scene (Prestige, 1957)
 1957: Jazz at Hotchkiss (Savoy, 1957)

With others
 Pepper Adams, 10 to 4 at the 5 Spot (Riverside, 1958)
 Manny Albam/Teo Macero, Something New, Something Blue (Columbia, 1959)
 Gene Ammons, Jammin' with Gene (Prestige, 1956)
 Cannonball Adderley, Discoveries (Savoy, 1955)
 Robert Barnes Sextette, Black Eyed Peas / Bobbin’ At Barbee’s (Fortune, 1949)
 Chris Connor, Ballads of the Sad Cafe (Atlantic, 1959)
 Walter Davis Jr., Davis Cup (Blue Note, 1959)
 Kenny Drew, This Is New (Riverside, 1957)
 Art Farmer, Three Trumpets (Prestige, 1957) – also with Idrees Sulieman
 Bunky Green, My Babe (Vee-Jay, 1965) – recorded in 1960
 Al Grey, Snap Your Fingers (Argo, 1962)
 Johnny Griffin, Johnny Griffin Sextet (Riverside), 1958
 Gigi Gryce, Gigi Gryce and the Jazz Lab Quintet (Riverside, 1957)
 Herbie Hancock, My Point of View (Blue Note, 1963)
 Gene Harris, Tone Tantrum (Blue Note, 1977)
 Jimmy Heath, Swamp Seed (Riverside, 1963)
 Elmo Hope, Informal Jazz (Prestige, 1956)
 Solomon Ilori, African High Life (Blue Note, 1964)
 Ahmad Jamal, Big Byrd: The Essence Part 2 (Birdology, 1995)
 Michel Legrand, Legrand Jazz (Columbia, 1958)
 Mundell Lowe, TV Action Jazz! (RCA Camden, 1959)
 Thelonious Monk, The Thelonious Monk Orchestra at Town Hall (Riverside, 1959)
 Wes Montgomery, Goin' Out of My Head (Verve, 1965)
 Dizzy Reece, Blues in Trinity (Blue Note, 1958)
 Rita Reys and The Jazz Messengers, The Cool Voice of Rita Reys (Columbia, 1956)
 Sam Rivers, Dimensions & Extensions (Blue Note, 1967)
 Art Taylor, Taylor's Wailers (Prestige, 1957)
 Jim Timmens, Gilbert and Sullivan Revisited (Warner Bros., 1958)
 Cal Tjader, Soul Sauce (Verve, 1964)
 Stanley Turrentine, A Bluish Bag (Blue Note, 1967)
 Doug Watkins, Watkins at Large (Transition, 1956)
 Ernie Wilkins, Top Brass (Savoy, 1955)
 Phil Woods, Pairing Off (Prestige, 1956)

References

External links 

Donald Byrd discography at jazzdisco.org
Donald Byrd at newyorkjazzworkshop.com

1932 births
2013 deaths
African-American academics
African-American jazz musicians
American funk musicians
American jazz trumpeters
American male trumpeters
Bessie Award winners
Blue Note Records artists
Cass Technical High School alumni
Columbia Records artists
Teachers College, Columbia University alumni
Columbia University alumni
Crossover jazz trumpeters
Elektra Records artists
Hard bop trumpeters
Jazz-funk trumpeters
Jazz fusion trumpeters
The Jazz Messengers members
Manhattan School of Music alumni
Musicians from Detroit
People from Teaneck, New Jersey
Post-bop trumpeters
Prestige Records artists
Savoy Records artists
Verve Records artists
Wayne State University alumni
United States Air Force airmen
Jazz musicians from Michigan
American male jazz musicians
The Blackbyrds members